Frontiers of Information Technology & Electronic Engineering is a monthly peer-reviewed scientific journal covering electrical and electronic engineering, including computer and information sciences. It was established in 2010 as Journal of Zhejiang University Science C (Computer & Electronics) and obtained its current title in 2015 when it started to be co-sponsored and administrated by the Chinese Academy of Engineering and Zhejiang University. It is now published by Zhejiang University Press and Springer Science+Business Media.

Abstracting and indexing 
The journal is abstracted and indexed in the Science Citation Index Expanded, EI-Compendex, Scopus, and Inspec. According to the Journal Citation Reports, the journal has a 2021 impact factor of 2.545.

References

External links 
 

Monthly journals
Electrical and electronic engineering journals
Publications established in 2010
English-language journals
Zhejiang University Press academic journals